Housing in the United Kingdom represents the largest non-financial asset class in the UK; its overall net value passed the £5 trillion mark in 2014.  About 30% of homes are owned outright by their occupants, and a further 40% are owner-occupied on a mortgage.  About 18% are social housing of some kind, and the remaining 12% are privately rented.

The UK ranks in the top half of European countries with regard to rooms per person, amenities, and quality of housing. However, the cost of housing as a proportion of income is higher than average among said countries, and the increasing cost of housing in the UK may constitute a housing crisis for some, especially for those in low income brackets or in high-cost areas such as London.

Housing is the jurisdiction of the Minister of State for Housing.

History

Victorian era
Rapid population growth took place in the nineteenth century, particularly in cities.  The new homes were arranged and funded via building societies that dealt directly with large contracting firms.   Private renting from housing landlords was the dominant tenure. People moved in so rapidly that there was not enough capital to build adequate housing for everyone, so low-income newcomers squeezed into increasingly overcrowded slums. Clean water, sanitation, and public health facilities were inadequate; the death rate was high, especially infant mortality, and tuberculosis among young adults.

1900–1939
The rapid expansion of housing was a major success story of the interwar years, 1919–1939, standing in sharp contrast to the United States, where the construction of new housing practically collapsed after 1929. The total housing stock in England and Wales was 7,600,000 in 1911; 8,000,000 in 1921; 9,400,000 in 1931; and 11,300,000 in 1939.

Renting during 1900–1939

The private rent market provided 90% of the housing before the war. Now it came under heavy pressure, regarding rent controls, and the inability of owners to evict tenants, except for non-payment of rent. The tenants had a friend in Liberal Prime Minister, David Lloyd George, and especially in the increasingly powerful Labour Party. The private rent sector went into a prolonged decline and never recovered; by 1938, it covered only 58% of the housing stock.

A decisive change in policy was marked by the Tudor Walters Report of 1918; it set the standards for council house design and location for the next ninety years. With the Housing, Town Planning, &c. Act 1919 David Lloyd George set up a system of government housing that followed his 1918 election campaign promises of "homes fit for heroes." It required local authorities to survey their housing needs, and start building houses to replace slums. The treasury subsidised the low rents. The immediate impact was the prevalence of the three-bedroom house, with kitchen, bathroom, parlour, electric lighting, and gas cooking, often built as subsidised council housing. Major cities such as London and Birmingham built large-scale housing estates – one in Birmingham had a population of 30,000 residents. The houses were built in blocks of two or four using brick or stucco, with two storeys. They were set back from curving streets; each had a long garden. Shopping centres, churches and pubs sprang up nearby. Eventually, the city would provide a community hall, schools, and a public library. The residents typically were the upper fifth stratum of the working-class. The largest of these two communities was Becontree in the outer suburbs of London, where construction began in 1921, and by 1932 there were 22,000 houses holding 103,000 residents. Slum clearance now moved from being a public health issue, to a matter of town planning.

Liberal MP Tudor Walters was inspired by the garden city movement, calling for spacious low-density developments and semi-detached houses built to a high construction standard. Older women could now vote. Local politicians consulted with them and in response put more emphasis on such amenities as communal laundromats, extra bedrooms, indoor lavatories, running hot water, separate parlours to demonstrate their respectability, and practical vegetable gardens rather than manicured yards. The housewives had had their fill of chamber pots.  Progress was not automatic, as shown by the troubles of rural Norfolk. Many dreams were shattered as local authorities had to renege on promises they could not fulfill due to undue haste, impossible national deadlines, debilitating bureaucracy, lack of lumber, rising costs, and the unaffordability of rents by the rural poor.

In England and Wales, 214,000 multi-unit council buildings were built by 1939; making the Ministry of Health largely a ministry of housing. Council housing accounted for 10% of the housing stock in the UK by 1938, peaking at 32% in 1980, and dropping to 18% by 1996, where it held steady for the next two decades.

Debates on high-rise housing
The fierce debates over high-rise housing that took place after 1945 were presaged by an acrimonious debate in the 1920s and 1930s in London. On the political left there was firm opposition to what were denounced as "barracks for the working-classes". Reformers on the right called for multi-storey solutions to overcrowding and high rents. There were attempts at compromise by developing new solutions to urban living, focused especially on slum clearance and redevelopment schemes. The compromises generally sought to replace inhospitable slums with high-rise blocks served by lifts. In the Metropolitan Borough of Stepney they included John Scurr House (built 1936–1937), Riverside Mansions (1925–1928) and the Limehouse Fields project (1925 but never built).

Ownership
Increasingly the British ideal was home ownership, even among the working class. Rates of home ownership rose steadily from 15 percent of people owning their own home before 1914, to 32 percent by 1938, and 67 percent by 1996. The construction industry sold the idea of home ownership to upscale renters. The mortgage lost its old stigma of a millstone round your neck to instead be seen as a smart long-term investment in suburbanized Britain.  It appealed to aspirations of upward mobility and made possible the fastest rate of growth in working-class owner-occupation during the 20th century.  The boom was largely financed by the savings ordinary Britons put into their building societies.  Starting in the 1920s favourable tax policies encouraged substantial investment in the societies, creating huge reserves for lending. Beginning in 1927, the societies encouraged borrowing through gradual liberalization of mortgage terms.

Post War

Housing was a critical shortage in the post-war era. Air raids had destroyed half a million housing units; repairs and maintenance on undamaged homes had been postponed. 3,000,000 new dwellings were needed. The government aimed for 300,000 to be built annually, compared to the maximum pre-war rate of 350,000. However, there were shortages of builders, materials, and funding. The Ministry of Works undertook the publication of a set of Post War Building Studies, that established technical guidelines for the use of new or modernised building materials. Not counting 150,000 temporary prefabricated units, the nation was still 1,500,000 units short by 1951. Legislation kept rents down, but did not affect purchased houses. 

The ambitions of the  New Towns Act 1946 project were idealistic, but did not provide enough urgently needed units. When the Conservative Party returned to power in 1951, they made housing a high priority and oversaw 2,500,000 new units, two-thirds of them through local councils. Haste made for dubious quality, and policy increasingly shifted toward renovation rather than new builds. Slums were cleared, opening the way for gentrification in the inner cities.

Working-class families proved eager to purchase their council homes when the Thatcher ministry introduced the "Right to Buy" scheme in 1980, alongside restricting the construction of new council houses.

According to a 2018 study in the Economic History Review, the ‘stop-go’ macroeconomic policy framework adopted by the Treasury and the Bank of England from the mid-1950s to the early 1980s restricted house-building during the period.

The National Audit Office maintains 200,000 starter homes promised in 2015 have not been built. Meg Hillier MP said, “Despite setting aside over £2bn to build 60,000 new starter homes, none were built. Since 2010 many housing programmes announced with much fanfare have fallen away, with money then recycled into the next announcement. The department needs to focus on delivery and not raise, and then dash, people’s expectations.”

Demography 

There are approximately 23 million dwellings in England and some 27 million across the UK. In 2009, about 30% of homes were owned outright by their occupants, and a further 40% were owner-occupied on a mortgage. About 18% are social housing of some kind, and the remaining 12% are privately rented.  The overall mean number of bedrooms is approximately 2.8.  Just under 40% of households have at least two spare bedrooms. 20% of dwellings were built before 1919 and 15% were built post 1990. 29% of all dwellings are terraced, 42% are detached or semi-detached, and the remaining 29% are bungalows or flats. The mean floor area is 95 square metres. Approximately 4% of all dwellings were vacant. Approximately 385,000 households reported a fire between 2012 and 2014, the majority of which were caused by cooking. 

In 2014, 2.6 million households moved dwelling, the majority of which (74%) were renters.  The National Housing Federation estimated that 8.4 million people in England lived in unaffordable, insecure or unsuitable homes. Research by Heriot-Watt University suggested one in eight people in England were adversely affected by fast-rising prices and missed house-building targets.

Government policy 
Housing is currently the responsibility of the Ministry of Housing, Communities and Local Government.

Supply and construction 

The Labour government suspected that there might be supply-side problems in the construction sector, and in 2006 commissioned the Callcutt Review of House Building Delivery, which was published in 2007. The Callcutt report noted the failure of the home building industry to increase the supply in response to price signals.

There was a fall in the numbers of house completions after the 2008 recession, but by 2015 it was back up to 169,000.

According to the Centre for Ageing Better in 2019, 21% of homes in the UK were built before 1919, 17% interwar (1919 to 1945), 55% from 1945 to 2000, and only 7% after 2000, making the  British housing stock older than any European Union countries.

Local planning authorities are required to continuously maintain sufficient land to meet housing needs for five years. It is estimated 250,000 new homes are needed each year just to keep up with the demand of the UK's continually growing population.

Purchase price of a dwelling 

After adjusting for inflation, the average cost of a home increased by a factor of 3.4 between 1950 and 2012.

In September 2015 the average house price was £286,000, and affordability of housing as measured by price to earnings ratio was 5.3.

The UK's home dwelling cost per type in July 2018 was on average:
		
Detached	£378,473	
Semi-detached	£230,284	
Terraced	£200,889	
Flat/maisonette	£230,603.

The London effect 
There is concern that councils in central London are aggravating the housing crises by pursuing policies of gentrification.

London is ranked as the top city in the world in terms of the number of ultra high net worth individuals who are resident in a city.

The consequence of this is seen in the high price for top-end dwellings. The most expensive home ever sold in the UK was 2–8a Rutland Gate, Hyde Park, which sold for £280 million in 2015. The most expensive street in the UK in 2016 was Kensington Palace Gardens, London, where the average price of a home was approximately £42 million.

A report for Wandsworth Borough Council found that overseas investors had a positive effect on housing affordability, both in bringing forward new homes in general and allowing the affordable housing part of schemes to be brought forward more quickly. They also found that there was very little evidence of housing being left empty.

See below for further information on claims that London properties are being kept empty by speculators.

Desirability of rising house prices
Dwellings represent the largest non-financial asset in the British balance sheet, with a net worth of £5.1 trillion (2014). In the national statistics rising house prices are regarded as adding to GDP and thus a cause of economic growth.

Historically, the assumption in the media and elsewhere was that rising house prices were a good thing. There is evidence that the public no longer share this view.

Renting 

Nearly two out of five households rent their home. However, the supply of rental properties has been declining since 2016 when the taxation treatment of rental property turned against landlords.

Nearly all dwellings  are let using Assured shorthold tenancy agreements. For the initial period, typically six months or a year, neither side can terminate the agreement. After this period, landlords can terminate the agreement at two months' notice.

Council Tax is paid by the occupier of the home unless it is a House in multiple occupation (HMO) when the landlord is liable.

High rents have not just affected those in the lower half of the income distribution; who have always been lifelong renters. In the era of the Keynes–Beveridge consensus those in the upper half of the income distribution would typically rent a home while saving for a deposit to get onto the property ladder. Today, young adults are not saving enough, and a quarter of young adults can expect to own homes in the next five years, while the rest will rent. This phenomenon has been called generation rent and there is much debate about the social consequences of this change.

In London, rents are double the national average, meaning that living in London has become a luxury good. People on median incomes who work in central London often live in the outer suburbs of London and the commuting towns of SE England. Many find that commuting using London's congested transport infrastructure lowers their standard of living and is disruptive to family life.

According to a report by the Centre for Housing Policy at the University of York, a quarter of a million families with babies and young children in England live in privately rented housing that does not meet the decent homes standard.

Research by Loughborough University, funded by Trust for London, showed that achieving a decent standard of living costs 60% more in inner London for a single working age adult than it would in the rest of the UK. The research found that rental costs were a major contributing factor to higher living costs in London. Average rents for a single working age adult living alone in inner London increased between 2014–18 by 14.8%. Rents in outer London increased by 19.4% over the same period.

Rent for student accommodation in 2019 is higher than the maintenance loan in London and a high proportion of the maintenance loan outside London. There are calls for more affordable student housing to be built.

The benefit freeze has prevented housing benefit covering the whole cost of renting for the poorest tenants. In a survey by Shelter, 40% of private renters said they had reduced clothes buying, 37% had used benefits meant for living costs to pay rent, more than a third had reduced spending on food, 28% had reduced heating, and a third had sold possessions. The housing benefit freeze may continue after other benefits are unfrozen. Polly Neate of Shelter said, “The freeze on housing benefit is pushing families into poverty and homelessness. People are being forced into desperate measures to pay their rent from selling their possessions and borrowing money to skipping meals. Politicians kicking [the housing benefit freeze decision] into the long grass means too many families will struggle through the winter, weighing up whether to pay their heating bill or their rent.”

Homelessness 

In June 2015 there were approximately 67,000 households in England in temporary accommodation. In autumn 2014 there were around 2,400 rough sleepers in England, 27% of which were in London. In 2018, around 320,000 people were homeless in the United Kingdom, both adults and children.

Overcrowding 
The consequence of the housing shortage and high rents manifests itself in overcrowding rather than In homelessness, The problem of over crowding is especially acute in London.  In 2011 it was estimated that there were 391,000 children in London living in overcrowded conditions.

Between 1995–1996 to 2013–2014, overcrowding, as measured by the bedroom standard increased from 63,000 households to 218,000 households. The bedroom standard understates overcrowding. It does not include potential household units forced to live in the same dwelling. For example, divorced couples living in the same dwelling, adult children being unable to form own household but having to live with their parents.  It has not proved possible to find statistics on the true extent of overcrowding.

A report issued by the Deputy Prime Minister's Office reviewed the evidence that overcrowding, in addition to the known impacts on physical health, adversely affects mental health and child development.

Housing quality 
It is useful to consider housing quality under two sub headings physical and social. In the era of Beveridge Consensus there were large scale slum clearance projects. Council environmental health officers inspected dwellings in a borough and those which failed to meet standards were compulsorily purchased  for a nominal sum and demolished. New dwellings were built to rehouse the slum dwellers. Slum clearance significantly  improved the physical quality of the British housing stock. But in a seminal study Family and Kinship in East London it was found that although the physical quality of the housing had improved, its  social quality had deteriorated. The residents of apartments in tower blocks appreciated their clean, warm, bright new apartments, but missed the supportive community networks of the slums.

Physical quality 
A 2015 report in The Guardian suggested that undocumented migrants, as they fear being deported and are easily exploited, do not report housing conditions which constituted a public health risk.

Although overall the quality of English housing stock has improved over the last thirty years, the quality of housing for new households formed from those at or below the median income has declined. Thirty years ago a new household in  this group could rent a council house built to Parker Morris standard. In 2016, a new household from this group, has to rent from a private landlord a dwelling, which will have less space than the Parker Morris standard dwelling, and likely to be damp, and they pay in real terms, at least three times the rent of their parent's generation.

Jessica McLean was a tenant who complained about a dwelling and claimed that she was evicted due to this.

Social quality 
For many people the social life their home enables is as important as the physical conditions the home provides. There is a debate about whether the generation born in the 1980s are better or worse off than their parents.  

Some economists claim living standards have improved for what has been called generation X, whilst others hold they have declined. The economist point to fourfold  growth in the nation's GDP, an increase GDP per capita, and an increase median earnings.  Those who contend that there has been a fall in living standards for generation X, say that increasing GDP per capita can be, and is in the UK, associated with a declining quality of life.  And that housing conditions of Generation X has made their standard of living far lower than that of their parents. They claim that the two major causes of decline in the social environment provided by housing are: symmetrical tenancy agreements and socially segregated housing developments.

Socially segregated housing 

The current position is that in London, only British citizens who are top earners are in the market to become home owners. In London, many apartments are marketed to, and bought by, foreign investors.  The ideal unit for such investors is in a gated development with a tower block of apartments, with car parking instead of gardens.

There is some evidence that gated developments improve security for residents, but perversely may increase the fear of crime. The residents of the gated development become fearful of those living outside of their secured space and only leave the development by car. They are too fearful to walk out of it and socialize with their neighbours outside.

Some commentators believe that where there is limited social interaction between owner occupiers and council tenants  there is much scope for misunderstanding.

Cost of home heating (energy efficiency) 

British homes are some of the most expensive to heat in Europe, which results in high levels of fuel poverty (for further information  see Fuel poverty in the United Kingdom). The problem results from age of the housing stock with most dwellings being built prior to oil shock of 1973, after which insulation standards for newly build housing improved. British dwellings had the oldest age profile in the EU with over 60% being built before 1960, and with only just over 10% being built between 1991–2010.  The graph above on the history of construction of new dwellings shows this age profile is a consequence of the reduction in the number of in new dwellings build per year after 1979.

There is a particular problem with dwellings built before World War I (1914–1918), which are now over a hundred years old. The terraced houses of this period, built for sale to the buy-to-let investors of the time, are particular difficult to insulate. These dwellings were built for heating by open coal fires, and had  large drafty windows to allow the fire to draw. They have very small rooms and have solid walls with a single leaf of bricks. This structure makes wall insulation expensive and in many cases impractical.  Many of the dwellings of this type were replaced by council houses in the post war slum clearance program, but with the ending of public sector building of dwellings this route for improving the energy efficient of the housing stock ended.

There are also insulation problems in the pre-1914 large houses built for the richest people of the time. These houses were built with servant quarters in the roof space. Most such houses have been converted into blocks of flats and sold to buy to let investors. These flats are difficult to insulate, especial the top floor flat in the roof space. The expense of insulation means that it is not often not cost effective for the landlord to insulate such dwellings. This is especially true in London,  where due to the housing crisis, landlords can let a property in poor condition, and consequently improving the energy efficiency of a dwelling is not a priority for buy to let investors.

There is also a problem in that only half the poorly insulated dwelling in the private rental sector use central heating, instead using more expensive electrical heaters.

Government policies for improving home energy efficiency 

To encourage home insulation the governments introduced The Green Deal, the Energy Company Obligation, and Energy Performance Certificates(EPCs).

The Green Deal does not offer any subsidies or grants for home insulation. Instead a new type of loan is provided which is attached to the property rather than the individual who takes out the loan. The purchaser of property becomes liable for the loan taken out to insulate the property. The Green Deal policy has met substantial criticism. In 2013, the Telegraph wrote that the high rate of interest charged for loans taken out under the Green Deal will mean there will be insignificant take-up, and hence the policy will be ineffective.

The energy company obligation provides means-tested grants for home insulation. The funding for these grants does not come from government taxation. Instead there is legislation that allows the energy utilities to raise a levy on all utility bills to pay for the means-tested insulation grants. In 2015 these charges added about £112 to the average utility bill. If the utility fails to spend the money it raises from the levies in insulating the homes of those in fuel poverty, it is fined. There have been problems with the scheme; utilities have been paying fines rather than providing the insulation.

The difficulties the utilities have had are in the low uptake of the grants. There is a particular problem in that most of the people in fuel poverty who are entitled to the grants are in the private rental sector. A tenant who applies for and gets a grant which improves his landlord's property has no security of tenure. The tenant will not benefit from reduced fuel bills, if the landlord puts up the rent, as the property has been improved. Understandably, tenants in fuel poverty have been reluctant to apply for the grants. The consequence of failure to take up grants is given as one of the reasons the UK is missing carbon reduction targets.

The idea behind EPCs was that if those buying or renting a property are informed about its energy efficiency market forces will lead to better insulated dwellings. To improve the working  of the market by providing better informed purchasers, under British law, whenever  a dwelling is built, sold, or rented an EPC is required.

An EPC gives an indication of the energy efficiency of a dwelling. The certificates have been criticized as they are based on visual inspection of the property, and examination of documents,  and not on measurements of energy use, or the insulation characteristic of the building. It is not possible to calculate the cost of heating a dwelling from its EPC, or the amount of energy which can be saved by insulating a wall, roof or window. There are claims that EPCs are of no real value. It is held that a certificate which can be bought for just £34, produced as result of form filling exercise, can not possibility be as useful as a proper energy survey based on measurement.

There have been improvements in housing insulation but this is mainly in the owner-occupier sector.  Between 2001 and 2013 the prevalence of cavity wall insulation of houses which have cavity walls rose from 39% to 68%. Over the same period the proportion of fully double-glazed dwellings rose from 51% to 80%. It has not proved possible to find evidence that these improvements were the result of government policy or would have happened anyway.

If all the recommendations by energy performance certificates were implemented the notional carbon dioxide emissions from British dwellings could be reduced by over 20%.

Empty homes

According to official statistics, in October 2015, there were 600,179 vacant dwellings in England, a decline from the 610,123 from a year earlier. Of these vacant dwellings, 203,596 were vacant for more than six months. This, it is believed, is mainly due to financial reasons, such as the owner being unable to sell the house or raise enough money to renovate the property. In November 2017, the government allowed councils to charge a 100% council tax premium on empty homes.

According to official statistics, the percentage of empty homes in England fell from 3.5% in 2008 to 2.6% in 2014. One explanation for this housing transactions have picked up since the financial crisis, and because of government efforts to reduce the number of empty homes. An alternative explanation is that before April 2013 there was an incentive for property owners to report a property as empty, as there was a rebate on council tax for vacant property. And when this incentive was removed, property owners ceased informing the council that their property was empty, and this led to an apparent fall in empty homes reported by official statistics.

The number of empty homes includes homes where the previous occupier is in prison, in care, in hospital or recently deceased.

The charity "Empty Homes" argued that empty homes were helping contribute to the housing crisis, saying in a report "The longer a property is empty the more our housing assets are being wasted. Also, the longer a property lies empty, the more likely it is to deteriorate; the more it is likely to cost to bring back into use; and the more it is likely to be seen as a blight by the neighbours."

Long-term empty homes
In 2016, there were around 200,000 empty homes in the UK, down from 300,000 in 2010. Empty Dwelling Management Orders (EMDOs) allow councils to take over the management of long-term empty properties but these are generally seen as a last resort and only 43 EDMOs were successful from 2006 to 2011. Government statistics show that long-term empty homes are generally concentrated post-industrial areas, in the North of England and in seaside towns, where property prices are generally lower, with the lowest percentage in London, which had 20,795 long-term empty properties, with the highest in Barrow-in Furness, Burley and Blackburn.

London
In 2015, around 1.7% of homes in London were empty, which is a historically low level. The vacancy rate was much lower for London's private sector housing compared to the rest of the country, whereas the rates for affordable housing were "broadly similar".

Research by Islington Council revealed that nearly a third of new dwellings built did not have anyone on the electoral register after six years, although this may exclude students and foreign tenants. The Observer reported on what has been termed 'lights out London' .. 'where absentee owners push up property prices without contributing to the local economy'. According to a local restaurateur 'my original customers [have sold to ] non-doms who do not live in their [property]. In some apartment blocks 20% were unoccupied... It makes a big difference [to my business]'.

The Guardian investigated the occupancy and the ownership of the apartments in St Georges Wharf Tower on the south bank of the Thames. The investigation found that 60% of the apartments were foreign owned, often by companies registered in tax havens. It further found that although there were bedrooms for over 600 people, there were only 60 people registered to vote.

Research by the London School of Economics for the Mayor of London found that there was almost no evidence of new build units being left empty, "certainly less than 1%" and that the "vast majority" of overseas buyers intended to live in the property or rent it out.

See also
 Building regulations in the United Kingdom
 Affordability of housing in the United Kingdom
 English land law
 Housing in Wales
 Land Registry (United Kingdom)
 Mortgage industry of the United Kingdom
 Public housing in the United Kingdom
 Real estate in the United Kingdom
 United Kingdom cladding crisis

References

Further reading
 Back, Glenn, and Chris Hamnett. "State housing policy formation and the changing role of housing associations in Britain." Policy & Politics 13.4 (1985): 393-412.
 Boddy, Martin. The building societies (Macmillan, 1980).
 Branson, Noreen, and Margot Heinemann. Britain in the Nineteen Thirties (1971) pp 180–201.
 Branson, Noreen. Britain in the Nineteen Twenties (1976) pp 103–17.
 Burnett, John. A social history of housing: 1815-1985 (2nd ed. 1986) 
 Clark, Gregory. "Shelter from the storm: housing and the industrial revolution, 1550–1909." Journal of Economic History 62#2 (2002): 489-511.
 Cowan, David. "‘This is Mine! This is Private! This is where I belong!’: Access to Home Ownership." in Cowan, ed., Housing Law and Policy (1999). 326-361.
 Damer, Sean. "'Engineers of the human machine': The social practice of council housing management in Glasgow, 1895-1939." Urban Studies 37.11 (2000): 2007-2026.
 Dunleavy, Patrick. The politics of mass housing in Britain, 1945-1975: a study of corporate power and professional influence in the welfare state (Oxford UP< 1981).
 Gauldie, Enid. Cruel habitations: a history of working-class housing 1780-1918 (Allen & Unwin, 1974).
 Ginsburg, Norman. "The privatization of council housing." Critical Social Policy 25.1 (2005): 115-135.
 Glynn, Sean, and John Oxborrow. Interwar Britain: A social and economic history (1976) pp 212–44.
 Hollow, Matthew. "The age of affluence revisited: Council estates and consumer society in Britain, 1950–1970." Journal of Consumer Culture 16.1 (2016): 279-296.
 King, Anthony D. Buildings and Society: Essays on the Social Development of the Built Environment (1980)
 Madigan, Ruth, and Moira Munro. "Gender, house and" home": Social meanings and domestic architecture in Britain." Journal of Architectural and Planning Research (1991): 116-132. in JSTOR
 Melling, Joseph, ed. Housing, Social Policy and the State (1980)
 Merrett, Stephen. State Housing in Britain (1979)
 Merrett, Stephen, and Fred Gray. Owner-occupation in Britain (Routledge, 1982).
 Pugh, Martin. We Danced all Night: A social history of Britain between the Wars (2008), pp 57-75.
 Rodger, Richard. Housing in urban Britain 1780-1914 (Cambridge UP, 1995).
 Scott, Peter. "Marketing mass home ownership and the creation of the modern working-class consumer in inter-war Britain." Business History 50.1 (2008): 4-25.
 Short, John R. Housing in Britain: the post-war experience (Taylor & Francis, 1982).
 Smyth, Stewart. "The privatization of council housing: Stock transfer and the struggle for accountable housing." Critical Social Policy 33.1 (2013): 37-56.
 Stephenson, John, British society 1914–45 (1984) pp 221–42.
 Swenarton, Mark. Homes Fit for Heroes: The Politics and Architecture of Early State Housing in Britain (1981). 
 Thane, Pat. Cassel's Companion to 20th Century Britain (2001) pp 195–96.

Historiography
 Hinchcliffe, Tanis. "Pandora's Box: Forty Years of Housing History." The London Journal 41.1 (2016): 1-16. Discusses articles on housing and the scholarly journal The London Journal Pepper, Simon, and Peter Richmond. "Homes unfit for heroes: The slum problem in London and Neville Chamberlain's Unhealthy Areas Committee, 1919–21." Town Planning Review'' 80.2 (2009): 143–171.

 
Real estate in the United Kingdom
Home inspection